The Islamic Azad University, Gorgan Branch (also known as Azad University of Gorgan) is a campus of Islamic Azad University system in Iran.

History
The university came of age under the direction of Abdol Ghayoom Ebrahimi, who was the first university chancellor during 1988–2000.

This university started its work with three majors (civil engineering, biology and agricultural engineering) and 60 students in 1988. It was then situated in Gorgan's Jorjan Street. Since then, the university has grown both in quantity and quality. At present, it has +500 faculty members, and approximately 13,000 students in B.S., M.S. and PhD of 48 majors.

Academics

Academic Campus

Education
At Present, Islamic Azad University of Gorgan is offering over 500 courses in 48 degree programs. The university awards bachelor's degrees, master's degrees and Doctor of Philosophy each year. The average class consists of 25 students (not including lab classes and discussion sections led by graduate student instructors).

Faculty members
Academic staff of the university has consisted of +500 faculty members, and includes full Professors, associate professors, assistant professors and instructors.

Alumni
Islamic Azad University of Gorgan has graduated many students who have gone on to earn doctorates in Iran and other countries, such as the United States. The acceptance rate to entrance examinations of master's degree, competitive all over the country, is notable. For example, Nora Taghavi, a graduate of Islamic Azad University of Gorgan, is now a graduate student in the Molecular, Cellular and Developmental Biology (MCDB) Department of the University of California at Santa Barbara, CA, in the United States.

Organization

Chancellors

The position of chancellor was created in 1988; there have since been three inaugurated chancellors and two acting chancellors:

Administration

The Chancellor has five Vice Chancellors:

See also
Higher education in Iran
Abdol Ghayoom Ebrahimi

References

External links

Official Websites

Islamic Azad University of Gorgan
Azad News Agency (ANA), official News Agency of Islamic Azad University

List of Universities in Iran

List of universities in Iran @wikipedia.org
List of Iranian universities @dictionary.laborlawtalk.com
List of Universities, Institutes and Colleges @irancivilcenter.com

Educational institutions established in 1988
Gorgan
Education in Golestan Province
Buildings and structures in Golestan Province
1988 establishments in Iran